Rahel Antonie Friederike Varnhagen (née Levin, later Robert; 19 May 1771 – 7 March 1833) was a German writer who hosted one of the most prominent salons in Europe during the late 18th and early 19th centuries. She is the subject of a celebrated biography, Rahel Varnhagen: The Life of a Jewess (1957), written by Hannah Arendt. Arendt cherished Varnhagen as her "closest friend, though she ha[d] been dead for some hundred years". The asteroid 100029 Varnhagen is named in her honour.

Life and works

Rahel Antonie Friederike Levin was born to a Jewish family in Berlin. Her father, a wealthy jeweller, was a strong-willed man who ruled his family despotically. She became close friends with Dorothea and Henriette, daughters of the philosopher Moses Mendelssohn. Through them she got to know Henriette Herz, with whom she would become intimately associated throughout her life, moving in the same intellectual spheres. Together with Herz and her cousin, Sara Grotthuis née Meyer, she hosted one of the famous Berlin salons of the 1800s. Her home became the meeting place for artists, poets and intellectuals such as Schlegel, Schelling, Steffens, Schack, Schleiermacher, Alexander and Wilhelm von Humboldt, Motte Fouqué, Baron Brückmann, Ludwig Tieck, Jean Paul, and Friedrich Gentz. During a visit to Carlsbad in 1795 she was introduced to Goethe, whom she met again in Frankfurt am Main in 1815.

After 1806, she lived in Paris, Frankfurt am Main, Hamburg, Prague, and Dresden. This period was one of misfortune for Germany; Prussia was reduced to a small kingdom and its king was in exile. Secret societies were formed in every part of the country with the object of throwing off the tyranny of Napoleon. Levin herself belonged to one of these societies.

In 1814, she married the biographer Karl August Varnhagen von Ense in Berlin, after having converted to Christianity — this also made her sister-in-law to the poet Rosa Maria Assing. At the time of their marriage, her husband, who had fought in the Austrian army against the French, belonged to the Prussian diplomatic corps, and their house in Vienna became a meeting place for Prussian delegates to the Congress of Vienna. In 1815, she accompanied her husband to Vienna and then to Karlsruhe in 1816, where he became a Prussian representative. She returned to Berlin in 1819, when her husband retired from his diplomatic position.

Though never the author of a major book, Rahel Varnhagen is remembered for the intensity and variety of her correspondence. Six thousand letters have survived, out of an estimated ten thousand written by her in the course of her lifetime. A few of her essays were published in Das Morgenblatt, Das Schweizerische Museum, and Der Gesellschafter; in 1830, her Denkblätter einer Berlinerin was published in Berlin. Her husband, Karl August, edited and published her correspondence in the 20 years after her death. Her correspondence with David Veit and with Karl August was published in Leipzig, in 1861 and 1874–1875 respectively.

Rahel Varnhagen died in Berlin in 1833. Her grave is located in the Dreifaltigkeitsfriedhof I Berlin-Kreuzberg. Her husband published two memorial volumes after her death containing selections from her work: Rahel, ein Buch des Andenkens für ihre Freunde (Rahel, a Memorial Book for her Friends; 3 vols., 1834; new ed., 1903) and Galerie von Bildnissen aus Rahels Umgang (Gallery of Portraits from Rahel's Circle; 2 vols., 1836).

Relations with Judaism
According to the Jewish Encyclopedia (1906), "Rahel always showed the greatest interest in her former co-religionists, endeavouring by word and deed to better their position, especially during the anti-Semitic outburst in Germany in 1819. On the day of her funeral Varnhagen sent a considerable sum of money to the Jewish poor of Berlin."

Amos Elon wrote about Rahel Varnhagen in his 2002 book The Pity of It All: A History of the Jews in Germany, 1743-1933:

This has alternatively been understood not as Varnhagen rejecting her Jewish roots, but as resenting the fact they were a barrier to entry into society. Thus, she was forced to prove that, in spite of being Jewish, she was still a valuable German citizen.  

Rahel's husband published an account of her deathbed scene, which Amos Elon described as "stylized and possibly overdramatised", including her alleged last words: 

The poet Ludwig Robert was her brother and she corresponded extensively with him. Her sister Rosa was married to Karel Asser. Ludmilla Assing and Ottilie Assing were her nieces-in-law.

Notes

References

External links

Official website of the Varnhagen Society, Cologne (in German)
Annotated bibliographic entry for Hannah Arendt's Rahel Varnhagen: The Life of a Jewess from the Center for Cultural Judaism
Website of the Centro Studi Rahel Levin, Turin (in Italian and German)
Rahel Varnhagen: The Salon Life, Video Lecture by Dr. Henry Abramson
Website of Prof. Deborah Hertz

1771 births
1833 deaths
Rahel
Writers from Berlin
Age of Enlightenment
Romanticism
German women writers
 19th-century women writers
 19th-century German writers
18th-century German Jews
Converts to Christianity from Judaism
German salon-holders
Burials at Dreifaltigkeitsfriedhof I, Berlin
People of the Haskalah
Jewish women writers
Women letter writers